The Maltese Government 1998–2003 was the Government of Malta from 6 September 1998 to 12 April 2003. The Prime Minister was Eddie Fenech Adami.

Cabinet

|}

See also
List of Maltese governments
Maltese Government 2003–2008

Government of Malta
1998 establishments in Malta
2003 disestablishments in Malta
Cabinets established in 1998
Cabinets disestablished in 2003